India was a battle honour awarded to the following regiments of the British Army for their service during the conquest of British India between 1787 and 1826:
12th (East Suffolk) Regiment of Foot, later the Suffolk Regiment
14th (Buckinghamshire) Regiment of Foot, later the West Yorkshire Regiment
65th (2nd Yorkshire, North Riding) Regiment of Foot, later 1st Battalion, the York and Lancaster Regiment
67th (South Hampshire) Regiment of Foot, later 2nd Battalion, the Hampshire Regiment
69th (South Lincolnshire) Regiment of Foot, later 2nd Battalion, the Welch Regiment
75th (Stirlingshire) Regiment of Foot, later 1st Battalion, the Gordon Highlanders
84th (York and Lancaster) Regiment of Foot, later 2nd Battalion, the York and Lancaster Regiment
86th (Royal County Down) Regiment of Foot, later 2nd Battalion, the Royal Ulster Rifles

References
Norman, C.B.: Battle Honours Of The British Army, From Tangier, 1662, To The Commencement Of The Reign Of King Edward VII. John Murray 1911.

Battle honours of the British Army